Visalakshinagar is a neighborhood situated on the northern part of Visakhapatnam City, India. The area, which falls under the local administrative limits of Greater Visakhapatnam Municipal Corporation, is about 5 km from the Dwaraka Nagar which is city centre. Visalakshinagar is located at the entrance of Visakhapatnam City on National Highway 16.

Transport
APSRTC routes

References

Neighbourhoods in Visakhapatnam